The 23rd Infantry Division (23-ya Pekhotnaya Diviziya) was an infantry formation of the Russian Imperial Army. Its headquarters was located at Tallinn (Reval).

Organization
It was part of the 18th Army Corps.
1st Brigade
89th Infantry Regiment
90th Infantry Regiment
2nd Brigade
91st Infantry Regiment
92nd Infantry Regiment
23rd Artillery Brigade

Commanders
1888-1893: Mikhail Batyanov
1894-1897: Richard Troyanovich Meves

References

Infantry divisions of the Russian Empire
Military units and formations disestablished in 1918
Governorate of Estonia